Infernal machine may refer to:

Weapons
 Infernal machine (weapon), a homemade gun used in the 1835 assassination attempt on Louis Philippe I
 Infernal machine, a 19th-century term for a naval mine
 The "machine infernale", used in the Plot of the rue Saint-Nicaise against Napoleon
 a machine or apparatus maliciously designed to explode and destroy life or property

Arts and entertainment
 Infernal Machine (film), 1933
 The Infernal Machine (play), a French play by Jean Cocteau
 "The Infernal Machine" (Space: 1999), a 1976 episode of the TV series Space: 1999
 "The Infernal Machine," a movement from the musical composition Phantasmata by Christopher Rouse
 Indiana Jones and the Infernal Machine, a 1999 video game by LucasArts
 Infernal Machines, a 2009 album by Darcy James Argue's Secret Society
 The Infernal Machine (2022 film), directed by Andrew Hunt and starring Guy Pearce

See also

 Infernal Devices (disambiguation)